The Divorcee is a 1930 American pre-Code drama film written by Nick Grindé, John Meehan, and Zelda Sears, based on the 1929 novel Ex-Wife by Ursula Parrott. It was directed by Robert Z. Leonard, who was nominated for the Academy Award for Best Director. The film was also nominated for Best Picture, and won Best Actress for its star Norma Shearer.

Plot
Ted, Jerry, Paul, and Dorothy are part of the New York in-crowd. Jerry's decision to marry Ted crushes Paul. He gets drunk and drives, causing an accident that leaves Dorothy's face disfigured. Out of guilt, Paul marries Dorothy. Ted and Jerry have been married for three years when, on the evening of their third anniversary, she discovers that he has had a brief affair with another woman. Ted tells Jerry it did not "mean a thing". Upset, and with Ted away on a business trip, Jerry spends the night with his best friend, Don. Upon Ted's return, she tells him that she "balanced our accounts", withholding Don's name.

Ted is hypocritically outraged, and they argue, which ends with Ted leaving her and the couple filing for a divorce. While Jerry turns to partying to forget her sorrows, Ted becomes an alcoholic. Paul and Jerry run into each other, and she discovers that he still loves her and is willing to leave Dorothy, with whom he is in a loveless, resentful marriage, to be with her. They spend two weeks together and plan for a future together.

Dorothy comes to speak with Jerry at her home but Paul is coincidentally meeting Jerry for dinner and the three meet for an awkward exchange. Despite good arguments from Paul, Dorothy’s desperation to not lose him forces Jerry to reevaluate her decision to leave with Paul. Ultimately, Jerry admits that she regrets giving up on her first marriage. She decides to see if her husband will reconcile, disappointing Paul bitterly a second time.

Weeks later, on her third attempt to locate Ted in Paris, Jerry finally finds him at a New Year's Eve party. After a polite exchange, Ted expresses his regret at how he reacted before the divorce. Jerry tells Ted her true feelings, and the two kiss at midnight to begin the new year, and presumably their new lives, together.

Cast
 Norma Shearer as Jerry Martin
 Chester Morris as Ted Martin
 Conrad Nagel as Paul
 Robert Montgomery as Don
 Helen Johnson as Dorothy
 Florence Eldridge as Helen Baldwin
 Helene Millard as Mary
 Robert Elliott as Bill Baldwin
 Mary Doran as Janice Meredith
 Tyler Brooke as Hank
 Zelda Sears as Hannah
 George Irving as Dr. Bernard
 Charles R. Moore as First Porter Opening Window (uncredited)
 Lee Phelps as Party Guest (uncredited)
 George H. Reed as Second Porter (uncredited)
 Carl Stockdale as Divorce Judge (uncredited)
 Theodore von Eltz as Ivan (uncredited)

Production
MGM production head Irving Thalberg bought the rights to Ex-Wife in the summer of 1929. Thalberg's original choice for the role of Jerry was Joan Crawford.

Norma Shearer, Thalberg's wife, originally was not in the running for the lead role in The Divorcee because it was believed that she did not have enough sex appeal. Only after Shearer arranged a special photo session with independent portrait photographer George Hurrell, and Thalberg saw the result, did he relent and give her the role.

Release
The Divorcee was released on DVD by Warner Home Video on March 8, 2008 (along with A Free Soul, also starring Norma Shearer), as one of five pre-Code films in the "TCM Archives - Forbidden Hollywood Collection, Vol. 2" DVD box set. Other movies with the same title were released in 1917, 1919, and 1969.

Reception
Norma Shearer won the Academy Award for Best Actress. Also starring in the film are Robert Montgomery, Conrad Nagel, Helen Johnson, and Florence Eldridge.

References

External links 

 
 
 
 
 

Films featuring a Best Actress Academy Award-winning performance
1930 films
1930 drama films
Metro-Goldwyn-Mayer films
American black-and-white films
Films based on American novels
American drama films
1930s English-language films
Films directed by Robert Z. Leonard
Adultery in films
Films about divorce
Films based on works by Ursula Parrott
1930s American films